USS Margaret is a name used more than once by the US Navy:

 , a cargo ship in World War I, later renamed USS Chatham (ID-2510).
 , a naval trawler purchased by the US Navy during World War I and configured as a patrol craft.
 , a yacht converted to a patrol craft during World War I.
 , a yacht acquired by the US Navy during World War I, and which was used as an armed patrol craft.
 , a schooner placed into service during World War I.
 , a motor boat on loan to the U.S. Navy during World War I.

United States Navy ship names